"Beers and Sunshine" is a song co-written and recorded by American country music artist Darius Rucker. It was released on August 6, 2020, as the intended lead single from his forthcoming sixth country studio album.

Rucker performed the song live at the 54th Annual Country Music Association Awards, which he co-hosted with Reba McEntire. The music video premiered on November 5, 2020.

Content
Rucker co-wrote the track over video chat with Ross Copperman, J.T. Harding, and Josh Osborne. Copperman also produced the track. The song's title is a play on words for "B.S." which is typically shorthand for bullshit, but Rucker's lyrics suggest "the only B.S. [he] need[s] is beers and sunshine."

Chart performance
The song debuted at No. 24 on the Billboard Country Airplay chart, making it Rucker's highest debut to date, surpassing the No. 26 start for "True Believers" in 2012. It later became Rucker's ninth Country Airplay number one, reaching the top in the issue dated February 27, 2021, and his first since “For the First Time” in 2018. It also debuted at No. 25 on the Billboard Hot Country Songs chart.

Charts

Weekly charts

Year-end charts

Certifications

References

2020 songs
2020 singles
Darius Rucker songs
Songs written by Ross Copperman
Songs written by J. T. Harding
Songs written by Josh Osborne
Songs written by Darius Rucker
Capitol Records Nashville singles
Song recordings produced by Ross Copperman